The South Korean National Agricultural Cooperative Federation (initialized as NH (in Korean, derived from NongHyup) or NACF) was established in 1961 to enhance the social and economic status of its membership and to promote a balanced development of the national economy. Its role is divided into three areas: marketing and supply, banking and insurance, and extension services.

Terminology

Although literally referring to local member cooperatives, the term nonghyup is used by South Koreans to describe both a local cooperative (Korean:농협) and the NACF (Korean: 농협중앙회).

History
 2012 - NACF restructured into a federation with two holding companies, to increase effectiveness and competitiveness
 2011 - Ranked ninth largest cooperative by the International Cooperative Alliance
 2011 - Opened NH Residential Hall to accommodate 500 students from farming households
 2011 - Launched 50th anniversary emblem and slogan
 2008 - Ranked third largest cooperative by the International Cooperative Alliance
 2008 - Opened International Banking(IB) center
 2007 - CHOI Won-Byung inaugurated as chairman of the NACF
 2006 - Hosted the 37th World Farmers’ Congress of the International Federation of Agricultural Producers (IFAP)
 2006 - Launched NH Investment and Securities after the acquisition of Sejong Securities
 2005 - Introduced the CEO system for each business division
 2004 - Launched the "New Rural Community and New Agricultural Cooperative" campaign
 2004 - Established Nonghyup Culture and Welfare Foundation
 2002 - Co-founded NH-CA Asset Management, Ltd. with the French Crédit Agricole
 2001 - Hosted the International Co-operative Alliance(ICA) General Assembly
 2000 - Launched the integrated NACF, consolidating the federations of agricultural, livestock, and ginseng cooperatives
 1998 - Acquired ISO 9002 certification for the NACF brand Kimchi, which was designated the official food for 1998 Olympics
 1995 - Founded the Korea Agricultural Cooperative Marketing, Inc, a subsidiary for produce distribution and sales
 1995 - Initiated the independent operation of the Marketing and Supply and the Banking and Insurance divisions
 1989 - Introduced a direct election system for the president of member cooperatives and the chairperson of the NACF
 1986 - Began supplying tax-free oil for farm machinery and equipment
 1985 - Launched an IT center equipped with 360 online networks
 1984 - Launched annuity and fire insurance businesses
 1984 - Launched credit card services
 1981 - Restructured the 3-tier organization to a 2-tier organization, consisting of individual cooperatives and the federation
 1969 - Launched the mutual credit business
 1961 - Established the NACF, consolidating agricultural cooperatives and the Agricultural Bank in accordance with Agricultural Cooperative Law

Member cooperatives

Member cooperatives are democratically controlled, autonomous business groups, funded by member subscriptions rather than government financial investment. They, in turn, fund the NACF through institutional subscriptions. Cooperatives are governed by directly elected presidents, who, in turn, elect a chairman of the federation.

Member farmers and associate members
Member cooperatives allow non-farmers, who have invested a certain amount of capital into the cooperative, to open tax-free bank accounts and access some services. However, whereas member farmers are defined as the genuine owners or stakeholders, associate members can only obtain limited access to or influence over the cooperative.

As of December 2011, the number of the member farmers was 2,446,836 and the number of the associate members was 15,262,611. In 2010, these figures were 2,447,765 and 14,483,532, respectively, indicating a decline in member farmers of 929, and an increase in associate members of 779,079.

Number of cooperatives
At the end of year 2011, the NACF comprised 1,167 head branches, alongside 3,306 cooperatives.

Korean agriculture
Recent international agreements have affected South Korean agriculture and by extension the effectiveness of the NACF. These include the European Union–South Korea Free Trade Agreement, implemented in July 2011, and the Free trade agreement between the United States of America and the Republic of Korea, which took effect on 15 March 2012. Proposed agreements include the China–South Korea Free Trade Agreement, the official public hearing of which was held at the World Trade Center Seoul on 24 February 2012.

Concerns over free trade agreements are reflected in the uncertain trends in Korean agricultural production. Total production by the agricultural sector in 2011 was KRW 44.62 trillion, up by 7.1% from 2010 (KRW 41.68 trillion) and including an 8.5% increase in the livestock and dairy sector. Conversely, the Korea Rural Economic Institute (KREI) expects the total production of agricultural industries to decrease by 1.1% in 2012.

Operational restructuring
On 2 March 2012, the NACF restructured its operations, establishing financial and marketing holding companies through the revised Agricultural Cooperative Law and a resolution of the board of directors on 2 February 2012. The new NACF performs as the center of the member cooperatives, governing the Extension and Support Unit, the Agricultural and Supply Business Unit, the Livestock Marketing and Supply Unit and the Cooperative Banking Unit.

Extension and support unit
The NACF supports the operations and management activities of member cooperatives by providing education and training for their members and working to promote the rights of farmers. It also provides investments to develop and promote new agricultural technologies and products.

Marketing and supply units
The NACF provides marketing support for the production, distribution, processing, and consumption of agricultural and livestock products, focusing particularly on increasing the income of farming households by expanding sales channels and reducing farming costs. This enables farmers to concentrate their efforts on farming.

Cooperative banking unit
The banking unit serves as an intermediary and facilitator, providing loan and deposit services for member cooperatives and engaging in other incidental businesses. As of 2011, the total deposit is KRW 209 trillion and the total loan volume is KRW 146 trillion.

Subsidiaries and affiliated organizations

NongHyup Financial Group 
Founded in 1961, NongHyup Financial Group was created from the merger of Agricultural Bank and Agricultural Federation. The objective of the financial holding company and its subsidiaries is to secure the funds and revenues necessary for the intrinsic activities of the NACF, and to provide differentiated banking services to its customers. The group provides financing, mortgages, personal lines of credit, corporate finance, real estate finance, and new technology finance services. It also offers life, property, and casualty insurance products.
 NH Nonghyup Bank Co., Ltd
 Nonghyup Life Insurance Co., Ltd
 Nonghyup Property & Casualty Insurance Co., Ltd
 NH-CA Asset Management Co., Ltd
 NH Nonghyup Investment & Securities Co., Ltd.
 NH Nonghyup Investment & Futures Co., Ltd.
 NH Capital Co., Ltd.

Marketing holding company
The objective of the marketing holding company and its subsidiaries is to vitalize the marketing and supply of agricultural and livestock products through advanced expertise and efficient product distribution.
 Korea Agricultural Cooperative Marketing Inc.
 Namhae Chemical Corporation
 Young Il Chemical Co., Ltd
 Nonghyup Hansamin, Ltd.
 Nonghyup Logistics Service, Inc. 
 Korea Agricultural Cooperative Trading Co., Ltd.
 Agricultural Cooperative Pusan Kyongnam Marketing, Inc.
 Agricultural Cooperative Chungbuk Marketing Co., Ltd.
 Daejeon Agricultural Products Marketing Center Co., Ltd.
 Nonghyup-Agro, Inc.
 Samhyup Nongsan Co., Ltd.
 Nonghyup Feed, Inc.
 Nonghyup Moguchon, Inc.

Controversies
In 2013, Rep. Bae Ki-woon (Minjoo) and monthly news magazine Sisa IN exposed NACF's unethical business practice of paying newspapers and other media outlets to run promo articles. Among the media outlets which received payment from NACF were newspapers Dong-A Ilbo (628.7 million won), JoongAng Ilbo (375 million won), Chosun Ilbo (56.6 million won), Kyunghyang Shinmun (33 million won) and Hankyoreh (12.5 million won), as well as news agency Yonhap News (132 million won) and news website OhmyNews (55 million won).

An NACF public relations employee, who requested anonymity, told The Korea Observer that it has paid media outlets in exchange of articles that promote the cooperative and its policies. The employee also said that NACF does not spend its money to bribe media organizations to stop publishing "negative" news against it.

See also
 List of South Korean companies
 List of Banks in South Korea
 Economy of South Korea
 Nonghyup Bank

References

External links
 

Cooperatives in South Korea
Agricultural cooperatives
Cooperative banking in Asia
Banks of South Korea
Agriculture in South Korea
South Korean companies established in 1961
Banks established in 1961